Jagger Eaton's Mega Life is an American docuseries that aired on Nickelodeon from September 9, 2016 to April 2, 2017. The series stars Jagger Eaton.

Episodes

Ratings 
 
}}

References

External links 
 

2010s American documentary television series
2010s Nickelodeon original programming
2016 American television series debuts
2017 American television series endings
English-language television shows